The Marguerite route is a tourist route in Denmark passing approximately 1000 of Denmark's smaller and larger attractions, sights and historic sites.

The total length of the route is 3600 km. The route was opened on April 21, 1991 by Queen Margrethe II. The route is named after Marguerite flowers (leucanthemum vulgare), the favorite flower of the queen.

External links

 Map of Marguerite route
 Margueritruten.dk
Visit Denmark, Marguerite Route
Watch Denmark from the Marguerite route

Tourist attractions in Denmark
Scenic routes